Walid Chattaoui (born 5 August 1978) is a Tunisian retired footballer and later manager.

References

1978 births
Living people
Tunisian footballers
AS Marsa players
CS Hammam-Lif players
Stade Gabèsien players
EGS Gafsa players
ES Zarzis players
Tunisian Ligue Professionnelle 1 players
Tunisian football managers
Stade Gabèsien managers
US Tataouine managers
Tunisian Ligue Professionnelle 1 managers
Association footballers not categorized by position